
Gmina Łańcut (Łańcut Commune) is a rural gmina (administrative district) in Łańcut County, Subcarpathian Voivodeship, in southeastern Poland. Its seat is the town of Łańcut (site of the famous Łańcut Castle), although the town is not part of the territory of the gmina.

Neighbouring gminas
Gmina Łańcut is bordered by the town of Łańcut and by the gminas of Białobrzegi, Chmielnik, Czarna, Gać, Krasne, Markowa and Przeworsk.

Villages
The gmina contains the following villages: Albigowa, Cierpisz, Głuchów, Handzlówka, Kosina, Kraczkowa, Rogóżno, Sonina and Wysoka.

References

Polish official population figures 2006

Lancut
Łańcut County